The Peter the Great Gulf (Russian: Залив Петра Великого) is a gulf on the southern coast of Primorsky Krai, Russia, and the largest gulf of the Sea of Japan.
Vladivostok, the largest city and capital of Primorsky Krai, and Nakhodka, the third largest city in the Krai, are located along the coast of the gulf.

Geography
The coast is indented by many smaller minor bays, including Possiet Bay, the Zolotoy Rog (the "Golden Horn"), and Diomede Bay in the west, Lazurnaya Bay (the "Shamora", with its sand beaches) in the Muravyov-Amursky Peninsula, and Strelok, Vostok and Nakhodka Bay to the east. The functioning of these bays as harbours is severely limited by the freezing from early December to mid-April. The exception is Nakhodka Bay, the only place on the Russian Pacific coast where the sea usually doesn't freeze.

The Peter the Great Gulf contains numerous islands, including the Rimsky-Korsakov Archipelago and Furugelm Island to the west, and Askold Island and Putyatin Island to the east. The Eugénie Archipelago is separated from the Muravyov-Amursky Peninsula by the Eastern Bosphorus, which runs between Vladivostok and Russky Island, the largest island in the archipelago and Primorsky Krai. In 2012, Russky Island was connected to the mainland by the Russky Bridge.

About  of the gulf area is protected as the Far Eastern Marine Nature Reserve, although the primary purpose for establishment of the Reserve is to assert the Russian Federation's maritime claims. Even though large whales have become very rare in the area today, eight species of cetaceans are known to migrate into the gulf. Common minke whales often swim nearby shores of the coastal towns, and Beluga whales are known to migrate to Rudnaya Bay in the north and occasional appearances around Vladivostok. The gulf's coastline is also frequented by seals and Steller's sea lions.

History
Initially from 1855 the gulf was known as Victoria Bay, but in 1859 it was renamed to Peter the Great Gulf in honor of Tsar Peter the Great. Russia founded the outpost of Vladivostok in June 1860, and acquired the entire Maritime Province (the present-day Primorsky Krai) under the provisions of the Treaty of Beijing in November 1860. The Manza War in 1868 marked the first major clash between Russians and Chinese -  being the Russian name for Chinese people of the area at the time. Hostilities broke out around Peter the Great Gulf when the Russians tried to shut off gold-mining operations and to expel 1000 Chinese workers who were employed near Vladivostok. The Chinese, not wanting to leave, resisted a Russian attempt to remove them from Askold Island. Afterwards, the Chinese raided two Russian Army military stations and three Russian villages in response.

A sailing regatta that annually takes place in the gulf is known as the Cup of the Peter the Great Gulf.

Between 5 and 12 July 2013 warships from the Russian Navy's Russian Pacific Fleet and from the People's Liberation Army Navy's North Sea Fleet participated in Joint Sea 2013 - bilateral naval maneuvers held in the Peter the Great Gulf. Joint Sea 2013 was the largest naval drill yet undertaken by the People's Liberation Army Navy with a foreign navy.

References 

 Detailed information about the Gulf

 
Gulfs of the Pacific Ocean
Gulfs of Russia
Bays of Primorsky Krai
Pacific Coast of Russia
Biosphere reserves of Russia